Adiabatic radio frequency (RF) pulses are used in magnetic resonance imaging (MRI) to achieve excitation that is insensitive to spatial inhomogeneities in the excitation field or off-resonances in the sampled object.

Nuclear magnetic resonance (NMR) experiments are often performed with surface transceiver coils that have desirable sensitivity, but have the disadvantage of producing an inhomogeneous excitation field. This inhomogeneous field causes spatial variations in spin flip angles, which, in turn, causes errors and degrades the receiver’s sensitivity. RF pulses can be designed to create low-variation flip-angles or uniform magnetization inversion across a sample, even in the presence of inhomogeneities such as B1-variation and off-resonance.

Analysis - Adiabatic Excitation Principles

Traditional RF Excitation 
In traditional MRI RF excitation, an RF pulse, B1, is applied with a frequency that is resonant with the nutation frequency of the spins of interest. In the frame rotating at the Larmor frequency, the effective field experienced by the spins is in the transverse plane. If the RF pulse is applied for a time shorter than the period of this precession, one can engineer the flip-angle (the angle with z-axis) by turning the pulse on and off at the appropriate time. 

In RF excitation analysis, the effective field is derived in the rotating frame of reference, which depends on the radial frequency of the radio-frequency  field.  in the laboratory frame is written as:

Where B0 is the background magnetic field which points along the laboratory z-axis. 

In the frame rotating about the z-axis at radial frequency, the effective magnetic field can be derived:

Therefore, the spin will precess about the x-axis in the rotating frame.

Adiabatic Passage 

In general, the RF magnetic field can be written with a time-varying phase and time-varying amplitude, so that, 

And Beffective in the frame rotating at  can be written as:

In an “adiabatic passage” process, the parameters A and ω can be varied gradually. Magnetic spin components that are in parallel with Beffective in the rotating frame will “track” Beffective as it changes, provided that Beffective changes “slowly enough.” Similarly, components that are perpendicular to Beffective will remain perpendicular to Beffective as it gradually changes direction. Figure 1 shows how spins track Beffective in an adiabatic passage transition.

The “gradualness” of the changing Beffective is defined as the “adiabaticity,” K, of the pulse, which is given by:

where  is defined as the angle of Beffective with the z-axis in the rotating frame of reference. 

The term K can be understood by examining the ratio by which it is defined: the precession frequency of a spin about Beffective is proportional to the strength of the effective field, and the angle of the field, phi, must change slower than the precession frequency so that the spin can “track” the effective field as it changes direction. This means that in order for a pulse to be considered adiabatic, the K-factor, or adiabaticity, must be greater than 1 for the entire duration of the excitation sequence.  

It is common to examine the so-called “sweep-diagram” for adiabatic pulses. Sweep-diagrams plot the trajectory of the effective field for a spin with a particular resonance frequency. Figure 3 shows the sweep diagram for two on-resonance spins: blue sweep trajectory for a spin experiencing a B1 field strength without error, and red sweep trajectory for a spin experiencing a B1 field strength with significant deviation. Since the direction of Beffective is largely independent of B1 strength, adiabatic pulses are considered insensitive to B1 inhomogeneities. 

For off-resonance spins, the Beffective sweep diagram is shifted up or down by the amount of off-resonance. Another interpretation: the frequency excursion of the adiabatic pulse is always centered at the presumed Larmor frequency. If we have a spin which is not at the Larmor frequency, the relative frequency excursion of the adiabatic RF pulse will not be centered at that spin’s resonance.

Adiabatic Pulse Design 
Adiabatic passage can be used to design several different kinds of pulses, which can be insensitive to common variations that are common in modern MRI system design. Several common adiabatic sequences are summarized here: adiabatic half-passage (AHP), adiabatic full-passage (AFP); and B1-insensitive rotation (BIR) pulses.

Adiabatic Half-Passage (AHP) 
The sweep diagram for AHP is the same as in Figure 3. Half-passage refers to a 90-degree rotation of Beffective. If the initial magnetization is along the initial axis of Beffective, the magnetization will track Beffective as it rotates. If the initial magnetization has components in the transverse plane, these perpendicular components will precess around Beffective during the time of the AHP pulse. The accumulated phase will depend on the length of the pulse and the strength of Beffective, so signal strength after AHP can be sensitive to initial transverse magnetization.

Adiabatic Full-Passage (AFP) 
The sweep diagram for AFP is also shown in Figure 3. AFP pulses are exactly the same as AHP pulses, except that the angle of Beffective is changed to 180 degrees. AFP pulses are also known as adiabatic inversion pulses. 

An interesting feature of AFP pulses is their insensitivity to off-resonance spins in a particular bandwidth. Figure 4 shows sweep diagrams for an on-resonance spin (blue) and the same sweep parameters for an off-resonance spin (red). The effective field has a trajectory which is shifted upward, but still has a final ending position which points along the –z-axis. For this reason, AFP pulses are considered insensitive to off-resonance sources, within a certain bandwidth. Spins with off-resonance outside this bandwidth will not experience an inversion, as shown in the sweep diagram.

B1-Insensitive Rotation (BIR) Pulses 
BIR pulses, also called “universal rotators,” induce arbitrary flip angles for all spins in a plane perpendicular to the rotation axis defined by Beffective. The plane that is perpendicular to Beffective is only defined by the direction of Beffective, and not the strength of Beffective. As long as adiabaticity is maintained during rotations of Beffective, inhomogeneities in the B1 field strength will not have an effect on the flip-angle of the magnetization after a BIR pulse. Two commonly analyzed BIR pulse sequences are explained and summarized here: the BIR-1 and BIR-4 pulse sequences.

BIR-1 

An important BIR pulse is known as the BIR-1. In this sequence, Beffective is applied initially along the +x-axis in the rotating frame, and then adiabatically swept from the +x-axis to the +z-axis. Magnetization in the plane initially perpendicular to Beffective remains perpendicular to Beffective throughout the adiabatic sweep. In the time that it takes the field to sweep, M precesses about the Beffective axis. Spins will have an arbitrary phase accrual due to precession about Beffective in the time period TP/2, and the amount of phase accrual will depend on the strength of B1. In the second half of the pulse, Beffective is applied along the -z-axis and adiabatically swept to point along the -y-axis. If the time of the -z to -y sweep is the same as the original +x to +z sweep, the phase-accrual due to B1 inhomogeneity will be reversed and M will now point along the -x axis. This process is shown in Figure 5, along the 90-degree path. 

BIR-1 pulses can be used to achieve an arbitrary flip angle. This is achieved by applying a phase-shift relative to the initial Beffective. In the case described above, the phase shift is 90-degrees. This can be understood by examining how the plane rotates during the second half of the BIR pulse. For a flip-angle of theta, the phase shift is designed:

The BIR-1 pulse with arbitrary flip-angle will rotate M about the x-axis by theta, and then apply a phase-shift of theta. This means that all flip-angles induced by BIR-1 pulses will not lie in the same plane. 

BIR-1 pulses can be sensitive to off-resonance effects for several reasons. Firstly, off-resonance spins will have asymmetric phase accrual in the first and second halves of the pulse, meaning that off-resonance spins may not be refocused by the BIR-1. Secondly, the initial Beffective for an off-resonance spin can have a significant component pointing along the z-axis of the rotating frame, which causes the spin to track Beffective during the entire adiabatic pulse (known as “spin-locking”). Spin-locked sources will end up pointing along the -y-axis after a BIR-1 pulse, since that is the final direction for Beffective.

BIR-4 
A BIR-4 pulse is designed simply as two BIR-1 pulses back-to-back. For a 180-degree excitation (inversion), the second BIR-1 sequence is performed with Beffective initially pointing along the –y-axis, sweeps to the +z-axis, flips to the –z-axis, and sweeps to the +x-axis. Exactly in the same manner as the first BIR-1 pulse, phase accrual of M occurs in the sweep from –y to +z, and is undone in the sweep from –z to +x. 

Arbitrary flip angles are achieved by selecting a phase-shift for each of the BIR-1 parts of the pulse. For a flip-angle of theta, the phase shift of each pulse is set by this design:

;      

The BIR-4 pulse with arbitrary flip-angle will always rotate M by theta about the initial direction of the Beffective field, which is not true of the BIR-1 pulse. This means that all flip-angles induced by BIR-4 pulses will lie in the same plane (if the initial Beffective is in the same direction for each of the BIR-4 pulses). 

Off-resonance spins will exhibit some degree of spin-locking to the Beffective field, similarly to the BIR-1 case.

Modulation Functions for Adiabatic Inversion Pulses 
Many different combinations of phase and amplitude modulated pulses can perform similar adiabatic inversions. The selection and/or design of adiabatic pulses depends on the required adiabaticity of the application. Once a required adiabaticity is defined, the amplitude and phase functions can be optimized against several desired features, such as reduction in the total time of the pulse, insensitivity to off-resonance or constant gradient fields, and reduction in the peak power required in the B1 pulse. 

We can examine the cases of AHP and AFP to demonstrate principles in adiabatic pulse design. In NMR excitation, it is desired to create offset-frequency-independent excitation with low RF peak power. The effective field experienced by this spin is given,

The adiabaticity of an AHP pulse is given,

Considering the time , where  for a particular off-resonance, the K-factor reduces to 

This represents the time when the rotating reference frame is rotating in resonance with the frequency-shifted spin. When this is done, the bandwidth of the adiabatic pulse can be defined by the width of off-resonance that still has a minimum K-factor greater than a minimum K-factor threshold. The pulses can be parameterized with desired constraints, such as pulse length or RF peak power, and the AHP pulse modulation functions can then be selected based on the desired application specifications.

Applications and Current Research 
Most applications of adiabatic pulse design are in MR spectroscopy or MR imaging where B1 inhomogeneity or effects like chemical shift cause significant errors. These applications include:

 Spectroscopy and imaging with surface coils that are used for both transmission and receiving.;;;

 Ultra-high-field NMR, which can induce non-magnetic resonances with non-trivial effects on B1 homogeneity

 Imaging in the presence of chemical-shift, where normal excitation would exhibit apparent spatial displacement (error in position) of off-resonant spins

 Spectroscopy and imaging applications that have constraints on RF peak power for excitation. 

In addition, several research efforts have demonstrated methods for inverse design of adiabatic pulse sequences

References 

Magnetic resonance imaging